Thomas Mitchell Boutwell (born December 31, 1946) is a former American football wide receiver who played one season with the Miami Dolphins of the American Football League (AFL). He was drafted by the Cleveland Browns in the thirteenth round of the 1969 NFL Draft. He first enrolled at Perkinston Junior College before transferring to the University of Southern Mississippi. Boutwell attended Hattiesburg High School in Hattiesburg, Mississippi. He was also a member of the Texarkana Titans.

References

External links
Just Sports Stats
College stats

Living people
1946 births
Players of American football from Ohio
American football wide receivers
American football quarterbacks
Southern Miss Golden Eagles football players
Miami Dolphins players
People from Bluffton, Ohio
American Football League players